BBC CWR (Coventry & Warwickshire Radio) is the BBC's local radio station serving Coventry and Warwickshire.

It broadcasts on FM, DAB, digital TV and via BBC Sounds from studios at Priory Place in Coventry city centre.

According to RAJAR, the station has a weekly audience of 57,000 listeners and a 3.5% share as of December 2022.

History

BBC CWR launch

BBC Local Radio in the early 1990s underwent an expansion programme where counties and other areas without a local radio station were identified and five stations were to launch: BBC Radio Surrey, BBC Radio Berkshire, BBC Radio Suffolk, BBC Wiltshire Sound and BBC Radio Warwickshire.

The Radio Warwickshire working title was changed to BBC CWR by the time the station launched on 17 January 1990. The name CWR (Coventry and Warwickshire Radio) reflected the wider area that the new station would cover, taking in the city of Coventry with the whole of the county of Warwickshire, which was then also served by BBC Radio WM. The station broadcast from a Victorian-style mansion on Warwick Road, close to Coventry railway station. Smaller studios were located in Atherstone, Nuneaton, Rugby, Stratford-upon-Avon and Warwick.

Problems and closure
From day one, BBC CWR faced strong competition from the established commercial radio stations in the area.  Mercia Sound had been an outstanding success since its own launch ten years earlier in 1980. Xtra AM, the AM-only sister station of Mercia Sound, also enjoyed high listenership since it split from Mercia and launched in 1989. Consequently CWR seemed to find it difficult to compete for the very large audiences built up by Mercia and Xtra. It was, however, well respected and highly regarded with its regular audience.

BBC WM merger
The BBC, under Director-General of the BBC John Birt, deemed that CWR was not sufficiently successful in audience terms to warrant its continuation, and within increasing financial constraints in February 1995 CWR was to close. Regular listeners were hugely disappointed and phoned presenter Jon Gaunt to protest about the decision. It was ultimately decided that BBC CWR would merge with neighbouring BBC Radio WM in Birmingham, but would operate as an opt-out service from Radio WM with the remainder of the schedule as shared programming. This merger took place in May 1995. This had the effect of alienating local listeners, whilst paradoxically presenters from WM, such as Ed Doolan, Malcolm Boyden and Tony Butler received high listening figures and distinctions with three Sony Radio Academy Awards, including Radio Station of the Year in 1996.

Its studios were relocated from Warwick Road to much smaller premises on Greyfriars Road. All local programmes except breakfast with Annie Othen, the afternoon show with Bob Brolly, Poles Apart on Wednesdays, and weekend football coverage of Coventry City, were replaced with programming from Birmingham.

2003 saw the station re-labelled as BBC WM across Coventry and Warwickshire.

BBC Coventry and Warwickshire relaunch
In 2003, the then Director-General of the BBC, Greg Dyke, announced on-air that Coventry and Warwickshire would again have its own BBC Local Radio station. Describing the situation with presenter Annie Othen, Dyke said that the station would be added to the BBC's Local Radio portfolio:

 "I'm very pleased to announce that we're planning to open a new radio station in Coventry – an area that's been served by BBC WM since 1995. We hope the new station will be housed in a modern, vibrant building close to Coventry Cathedral in the heart of the city.  Alongside the radio studios, there'll also be an open centre to provide access to BBC Learning facilities similar to the already established centres in Blackburn, Sheffield and Stoke.  Open Centres provide a valuable community role, so this is an exciting venture for the BBC."

He also said that the 1995 closure of CWR was a "mistake":
 "The decision was made under different circumstances – and now we're in a position to change it." 

BBC Coventry and Warwickshire relaunched as a stand-alone station on 3 September 2005 with full local programming for 15 hours a day.

In February 2020, BBC Coventry & Warwickshire reverted to the BBC CWR name.

Programming
Local programming is produced and broadcast from the BBC's Coventry studios from 6am - 10pm on Mondays - Saturdays and from 6am - 6pm on Sundays.

Off-peak programming, including the late show from 10pm - 1am, originates from BBC Radio WM in Birmingham.

During the station's downtime, BBC CWR simulcasts overnight programming from BBC Radio 5 Live and BBC Radio London.

Sports coverage
The station provides coverage of a range of sports, including live commentary, reports and updates. The flagship sports programme is BBC CWR Sport (also referred on air as Sky Blues Sport). It is broadcast mostly on Saturday afternoons (and occasionally on Sundays and weeknights). The mainstay of the coverage is live match commentary of Coventry City matches. A twice-weekly Friday evening phone-in programme about Coventry City airs on Mondays and Fridays.

Since their relocation to Coventry, the station has provided live match commentary of Wasps RFC games (as a part of BBC Sport's national contract with Premiership Rugby). Games in the Aviva Premiership, Anglo-Welsh Cup and European Rugby Champions Cup are broadcast predominately online (and, on occasion, on DAB and FM). Coventry RUFC's matches in the RFU Championship are also covered live. Alec Blackman, John Butler and Richard Moon are all involved with rugby coverage.

Online match commentary and radio reports of Leamington's and Nuneaton Borough's games are also provided. Commentary of Warwickshire County Cricket Club games can be found on air and online.

Presenters
Notable current presenters include:

Trish Adudu (weekday drivetime)
Bob Brolly (Sunday afternoons)
Steve Ogrizovic (BBC CWR Sport)

Notable past presenters

Malcolm Boyden
Ed Doolan
Jon Gaunt
Jim Lee
Alex Lester
Stuart Linnell
Les Ross
Tony Wadsworth

Transmission
The BBC initially supplied two powerful FM transmitters for BBC CWR to cover the whole of the county. A 2.2 kilowatt transmitter at an existing tower at Meriden provides Coventry and North Warwickshire with good signals on 94.8 MHz, a frequency vacated by BRMB Radio in Birmingham before it moved to 96.4 MHz in 1989.

The South Warwickshire area receives a strong signal on 103.7 MHz from a 1.4 kW transmitter located at an existing television relay site on a hill at Lark Stoke, 7.5 km west-northwest of Shipston-on-Stour and 12 km south of Stratford-upon-Avon.

A small pocket of poor reception in Nuneaton was later resolved by adding a low power relay transmitter on 104.0 MHz

BBC CWR went digital shortly after the launch of the local DAB multiplex on 31 January 2001 with NOW Digital 12D Coventry in the Coventry area with transmissions from Samuel Vale House (central Coventry), Barwell Water Tower near Hinckley, Meriden and Leamington Spa. BBC CWR is carried along with other local stations Free Radio (formerly Mercia FM) and Capital Mid-Counties.

In addition, BBC CWR also broadcasts on Freeview TV channel 719 in the BBC West Midlands region and streams online via BBC Sounds.

See also
 BBC Radio WM
 Free Radio
 Free Radio Coventry & Warwickshire
 Capital Mid-Counties

References

BBC Coventry and Warwickshire .
MDS975 – BBC CWR History 
Aircheck – History of Radio articles

External links
 BBC CWR
 Media UK BBC CWR
 MDS975's BBC CWR page
  History of local radio in Warwickshire
 MDS975's Memories of Mercia Sound page
 MDS975's Warwickshire radio transmitter coverage maps
 Barwell Water Tower (Digital)
 MB21's Lark Stoke transmitter page
 Leamington Spa (Digital)
 Meriden transmitter
 Nuneaton transmitter
 Samuel Vale House (Digital)
 David's Transmitter World

Audio clips
 Jon Gaunt launches the station in 2005
 Jingle package

WM (Coventry and Warwickshire)
Coventry
Organisations based in Warwickshire
Radio stations in Warwickshire
Radio stations in the West Midlands (region)